Búfalos Futbol Club, commonly known as Búfalos, is a Nicaraguan football team which used to play at the top level.

The team is based in Managua and has won one league title.

Achievements
Primera División de Nicaragua: 1
 1980

List of Managers

 Eduardo “Caramelo” Terán (1983–1984)
 Salvador Dubois Leiva
 Edgardo Baldi (1978)

References

External links

Football clubs in Nicaragua